Beeturia is the passing of red or pink urine after eating beetroots or foods colored with beetroot extract or beetroot pigments. The color is caused by the excretion of betalain (betacyanin) pigments such as betanin. The coloring is highly variable between individuals and between different occasions, and can vary in intensity from invisible to strong. The pigment is sensitive to oxidative degradation under strongly acidic conditions. Therefore, the urine coloring depends on stomach acidity and dwell time as well as the presence of protecting substances such as oxalic acid. Beeturia is often associated with red or pink feces.

Cause

The red color seen in beeturia is caused by the presence of unmetabolized betalain pigments such as betanin in beetroot passed through the body. The pigments are absorbed in the colon. Betalains are oxidation-sensitive redox indicators that are decolorized by hydrochloric acid, ferric ions, and colonic bacteria preparations. The gut flora play a not-yet-evaluated role in the breakdown of the pigment.

Explanations
 There is some relationship  to iron deficiency.
 There is no known relation to deficiencies in liver metabolism or removal from the body by the kidneys.
 There is no known direct genetic influence, and no single gene variant, that differentiates excreters from non-excreters.

Factors affecting beeturia
The extent of excreted pigment depends on:
 The pigment content of the meal, including:
 The type of beetroot (for instance, the pigment concentration of the Detroit Rubidus variety is twice that of the Firechief variety)
 The addition of concentrated beetroot extract as a food additive to certain processed foods
 The storage conditions of the meal, including light, heat, and oxygen exposure, and repeated freeze-thaw cycles that all could degrade the pigments
 Urine volume, affecting the dilution of the dye
 The stomach acidity and dwell time
 The presence of protecting substances such as oxalic acid in the meal and during intestinal passage
 Medications that affect stomach acidity such as proton pump inhibitors

See also
 Food color
 Porphyria, a group of disorders that may cause reddish urine
 Blue diaper syndrome

References

External links
 Beeturia - Allergy Advisor

Symptoms and signs: Urinary system
Urine